Octave Maus (12 June 1856 – 26 November 1919) was a Belgian art critic, writer, and lawyer.

Maus worked with fellow writer/lawyer Edmond Picard, and they together with Victor Arnould and Eugène Robert founded the weekly L'Art moderne in 1881.  

In 1884 Maus was elected the secretary of the recently formed Les XX, and his responsibilities included the organization of the annual exhibitions.

In 1893 Maus advocated the dissolution of Les XX. In 1894 he founded La Libre Esthétique.

The composer Poldowski (daughter of Henryk Wieniawski) was a neighbour and lifelong friend of Maus's.  She dedicated some of her song settings to Maus and his wife Madeleine, and her 1923 series of midday recitals at the Hyde Park Hotel in London, known as The International Concerts of La Libre Esthétique, attracted Arthur Rubinstein, Jacques Thibaud and the London String Quartet.

Bibliography
 Madeleine Octave Maus: Trente années de l'lutte pour l'art, Librairie L'Oiseau bleau, Bruxelles 1926; reprinted by Éditions Lebeer Hossmann, Bruxelles 1980

References

External links

1856 births
1919 deaths
Belgian art critics
Writers from Brussels
Jurists from Brussels
Belgian magazine founders